No Direction Home is a 2005 Martin Scorsese documentary on the life of singer-songwriter Bob Dylan.

No Direction Home may also refer to:

 The Bootleg Series Vol. 7: No Direction Home: The Soundtrack, a 2005 rarities compilation album that accompanies the film
 No Direction Home (album), a 1983 album by Nantucket